Jake Dane Forster-Caskey (born 25 April 1994) is an English professional footballer who plays as a central midfielder for  club Stevenage.

He is the son of former professional player Darren Caskey and is the stepson of the former striker Nicky Forster. Forster-Caskey has represented England at under-16, under-17, under-18 and under-21 level.

Club career

Brighton & Hove Albion
Forster-Caskey joined Brighton's youth team in 2007. On 30 April 2010, he was offered a scholarship deal with Brighton & Hove Albion. It was later revealed that Forster-Caskey rejected interest from Premier League clubs Arsenal and Aston Villa before signing with Brighton.

The following day, Forster-Caskey was named as an unused substitute during the 0–0 draw away to Milton Keynes Dons. After a man-of-the-match performance during the Sussex Senior Cup final, whilst scoring twice during a 4–0 victory over Bognor Regis Town, Forster-Caskey was once again named as a substitute for Brighton's final game of the 2009–10 season against Yeovil Town. During the match, he became the youngest player to feature in the Brighton first team when he made his debut as a substitute in the 76th minute. Forster-Caskey made his second substitute appearance for Brighton during the 3–0 defeat to Stoke City in the 5th round of the FA Cup on 19 February 2011. He made his full first-team debut, and scored his first Brighton goal, during the Seagulls' 3–0 win over Southampton on 2 January 2012. He scored the opening goal for Brighton, and was named Man of the Match.
In his next game, Forster-Caskey again scored and received Man of the Match in an FA Cup tie with Wrexham. In all, Forster-Caskey made 6 appearances during the 2011–12 season, scoring 2 goals. On 21 June 2012, Forster-Caskey signed a new deal, keeping him at the club until 2015.

Oxford United (loan)
In July 2012, Forster-Caskey signed a six-month loan deal with League Two club Oxford United. He scored on his debut, a 20-yard left-footed strike, in a 2–0 win over Bristol Rovers. He scored his second goal on 8 September, in a 4–2 defeat at home to Exeter City. His third and final goal for Oxford came against Wimbledon, a 20-yard free kick into the top corner. In total he made 16 league appearances for Oxford before his loan spell concluded on 1 January 2013.

Milton Keynes Dons (loan)
On 22 September 2015, Forster-Caskey joined Championship side Milton Keynes Dons on an initial five-week emergency loan deal. On 26 September 2015 he made his debut for the club in the 1–3 home defeat to Derby County.

On 8 January 2016, Forster-Caskey rejoined the club on loan for the remainder of the 2015–16 season. On 13 February 2016, he scored his first goal for the club, scoring direct from a free-kick in a 0–1 away win against Derby County.

Rotherham United (loan)

He joined Rotherham United on 20 July 2016 on a season-long loan deal. The deal was mutually terminated by Rotherham and parent club Brighton on 5 January 2017, after he had made seven appearances for the Millers.

Charlton Athletic

On 5 January 2017, Forster-Caskey joined Charlton Athletic, signing a -year contract.

He was out of the squad for most of the 2018–19 season with an anterior cruciate knee ligament injury. He was offered a new contract by Charlton at the end of the 2018–19 season. He signed a new one-year contract in June 2019.

On 5 July 2021, Forster-Caskey signed a new one-year deal with the club ahead of the 2021–22 season.

Stevenage
On 3 January 2023, Forster-Caskey signed for League Two club Stevenage.

International career
Forster-Caskey has represented the England under-16s, England under-17s, England under-18s and England under-20s national sides. He was announced as a member of the squad to feature in the annual Nordic under-17s tournament, commencing during August 2010. Forster-Caskey captained the England side as they recorded a 5–0 success over Finland in the first game of the tournament where he also scored his first international goal. He was also involved in the FA International Tournament, where he started in a 4–0 win over Australia, before substitute appearances in the 2–2 draw against Turkey and a 3–1 victory against Portugal.

During April 2011, Forster-Caskey was announced in the 18-man squad to represent England at the 2011 UEFA European Under-17 Football Championship in Serbia, commencing on 3 May. He made three appearances in the tournament for England before they were defeated 1–0 by Holland in the semi-final.

Forster-Caskey was also selected to represent England under-17s at the 2011 FIFA U-17 World Cup in Mexico. England won their group and reached the quarter-finals, where they lost 3–2 to Germany.

During October 2011, Forster-Caskey was selected for the England under-18 national side for a friendly against Slovakia, where he played 45 minutes before being substituted for Jordan Lussey at half-time.

Forster-Caskey was named in the initial 35-man squad for the 2013 Fifa Under 20 World Cup on 17 May 2013 by manager Peter Taylor, but failed to make the final 21-man squad selected on 28 May.

During May 2014, Jake and fellow Brighton teammate Solomon March were called up to the under-21 squad for the U21 qualifier versus Wales and the 2014 Toulon Tournament. Jake made his debut for the U21s coming on as a late substitute in the 3–1 victory against Wales.

Personal life
Until February 2011, Forster-Caskey was simply known as Jake Caskey before altering his surname to Forster-Caskey in homage to his stepfather Nicky Forster. In a brief explanation, Forster-Caskey stated "I did it out of respect for my stepdad – because he has been a great role model and parent to me. I have lived with him for the last ten years and he has been a huge influence on me."

Career statistics

Honours

Charlton Athletic
EFL League One play-offs: 2019

Individual
Charlton Athletic Player of the Year: 2020–21

References

External links
Jake Forster-Caskey profile  at the official Brighton & Hove Albion F.C. website
Jake Forster-Caskey profile at the official Football Association website

1994 births
Living people
Sportspeople from Southend-on-Sea
English footballers
Association football midfielders
England youth international footballers
England under-21 international footballers
Brighton & Hove Albion F.C. players
Oxford United F.C. players
Milton Keynes Dons F.C. players
Rotherham United F.C. players
Charlton Athletic F.C. players
Stevenage F.C. players
English Football League players